The voiced palatal nasal is a type of consonant used in some spoken languages.

In Spanish and languages whose writing systems are influenced by Spanish orthography, it is represented by the letter , called eñe ("enye"). In French and Italian orthographies the sound is represented by the digraph . Occitan uses the digraph , the source of the same Portuguese digraph called ene-agá, used thereafter by languages whose writing systems are influenced by Portuguese orthography, such as Vietnamese. In Catalan, Hungarian and many African languages, as Swahili or Dinka, the digraph  is used. In Albanian and some countries that used to be Yugoslavia, the digraph (Nj) is used, and sometimes, for the languages with the Cyrillic script that used to be part of Yugoslavia, uses the (Њњ) Cyrillic ligature that might be part of the official alphabet. In Czech and Slovak, // is represented by letter  whilst Kashubian and Polish uses .

The voiced alveolo-palatal nasal is a type of consonantal sound, used in some oral languages. There is no dedicated symbol in the International Phonetic Alphabet that represents this sound. There is a non-IPA letter  (plus the curl found in the symbols for alveolo-palatal sibilant fricatives ), used especially in Sinological circles.

The alveolo-palatal nasal is commonly described as palatal; it is often unclear whether a language has a true palatal or not. Many languages claimed to have a palatal nasal, such as Portuguese, actually have an alveolo-palatal nasal. This is likely true of several of the languages listed here. Some dialects of Irish as well as some non-standard dialects of Malayalam are reported to contrast alveolo-palatal and palatal nasals.

There is also a post-palatal nasal (also called pre-velar, fronted velar etc.) in some languages. Palatal nasals are more common than the palatal stops .

Features

Features of the voiced palatal nasal:

Occurrence

Palatal or alveolo-palatal

Post-palatal

See also
 Nasal palatal approximant
 Index of phonetics articles
 Ɲ (upper and lower case letter used in some orthographies)

Notes

References

External links
 

Nasal consonants
Palatal consonants
Alveolo-palatal consonants
Pulmonic consonants
Voiced consonants